Vijay is an Indian actor and playback singer who works in Tamil films. The son of singer Shoba Chandrasekhar, Vijay debuted in the lead role in early 1990s, appearing in Naalaiya Theerpu, directed by his father S. A. Chandrasekhar. He has sung for composers including but not limited to, Deva, Ilaiyaraaja, Yuvan Shankar Raja, Vidyasagar, Sirpy, Bharani, S. A. Rajkumar, Ramana Gogula, D. Imman, Devi Sri Prasad, Harris Jayaraj, G. V. Prakash Kumar, Anirudh Ravichander, Santhosh Narayanan, A. R. Rahman and Thaman S. He is one of the most prolific singers among Tamil actors.

Vijay made his debut by singing "Bombay City Sukkha Rotti" (1994) in Rasigan. After his 25th song "Vaadi Vaadi" (2005) in Sachein, Vijay took a sabbatical from singing to concentrate on acting, but made a comeback with "Google Google" in Thuppakki (2012). He won the Favorite Song of The Year at the Vijay Awards for his performance of the song. and a SIIMA Award nomination for Best Playback Singer.

In 2016, the pop song "Selfie Pulla" which Vijay had recorded in 2014 became popular in Romania and other European countries. He was nominated for a Filmfare Award South in the Best Playback Singer category for "Selfie Pulla". In 2015 he was again nominated for Best Playback Singer, for his performance of "Yaendi Yaendi". Ranjithamae song was well received for Vijay's vocal and dance in Pakistan and Bangladesh.

Songs

See also 
 Vijay filmography
 List of awards and nominations received by Vijay

References 

Vijay
Songs